Raising Hell: How the Center for Investigative Reporting Gets the Story is a nonfiction work by David Weir and Dan Noyes, with a foreword by Mike Wallace.  It was published in 1983 by Addison-Wesley Publishing Company and contains reprints of investigative journalism articles from the time period, with analysis and background on how the journalists investigated the issues and prepared for the articles.  An article by Kate Coleman and Paul Avery called "The Party's Over", which discussed the Black Panthers, was analyzed.

Jessica Mitford and Mike Wallace both wrote positively of the book.  It was also reviewed in Newspaper Research Journal.

Raising Hell is used as a college textbook, and is referenced in Pearson's The Shadow of the Panther, and in John Lofland's Social Movement Organizations: Guide to Research on Insurgent Realities.

See also 
 Center for Investigative Reporting

References

External links 
 Center for Investigative Reporting
 Web site Dan Noyes

1983 non-fiction books
Books about journalism